Turning is a 2002 Russian drama film directed by Valery Fokin.

Plot 
The film tells about an exemplary family man who had a nightmare, after which he turned into a disgusting insect.

Cast 
 Yevgeny Mironov 
 Igor Kvasha	
 Tatyana Lavrova
 Avangard Leontev
 Natalya Shvets

References

External links 
 

2002 films
2000s Russian-language films
Russian drama films
2002 drama films